Walk Like a Man, full title Walk Like a Man: A Real Life Drama About Blood, Sweat & Queers is a 2008 Australian documentary film about gay rugby union co-produced and co-directed by Patricia Zagarella and Jim Morgison and narrated by Australian former rugby league international Ian Roberts.

Filmed in San Francisco, Sydney, Australia and New York, it concentrates on preparations for the 2006 New York final of the Bingham Cup (Mark Kendall Bingham Memorial Tournament), effectively the World Cup of gay rugby union, by the two finalist teams, the reigning incumbent champions San Francisco Fog RFC and the up-and-coming rivals, the Sydney Convicts. The Convicts end up winning the Cup with a score of 16–10.

The prize is named after Mark Bingham, a gay rugby player and a member of San Francisco Fog, and a 9/11 hero, was a passenger on United Airlines Flight 93 and courageously stormed the cockpit and prevented the hijackers from hitting their eventual target.

The film was released in February 2008. It was shown on Australian Special Broadcasting Service and also shown on Logo TV.

Cast
Narrator
Ian Roberts

San Francisco Fog
Annah-Ruth Dominis
Pete Dubois 
Sean Dmyterko	
Bryce Eberhart
Leandro Gonzales
Andrew Sullivan

Sydney Convicts 
Luke Carpenter
Angus Donald 
Sam Irvine
Andrew Purchas
Rob Rosenberg 
Charlie Winn
Steve Thorne

Commentators
Peter FitzSimons
Alice Hoagland
Esera Tuaolo
Chris Stahl

References

External links
Official film website

2008 films
2008 documentary films
Documentary films about gay men
Rugby union films
Australian LGBT-related films
Documentary films about LGBT sportspeople
2008 LGBT-related films
LGBT sports
Films shot in Sydney
Films shot in San Francisco
Films shot in New York City
2000s English-language films
2000s Australian films